The Lincoln Haymakers were a professional indoor football team based in Lincoln, Nebraska. The Haymakers played their 2013–2014 home games at the Pershing Center.

The Haymakers were the second indoor football team to call Lincoln home, following the Lincoln Lightning/Capitols which played in the original Indoor Football League (1999–2000), arenafootball2 (2001), and the National Indoor Football League (2002–2006). The Haymakers were last coached by Cory Ross. In 2013, Ross served as an interim head coach after previous coach Dave Brumagen was suspended for the season after pushing an Omaha Beef player to the ground after the player had scored a touchdown on May 11. Brumagen was replaced by Trever Whiting on July 22, 2013 as the Haymakers Head Coach. Three months later Whiting was dismissed from the organization. On October 28, 2013, Ross was officially announced by the team as the new head coach for the second season of play.

After playing in the Champions Professional Indoor Football League for two seasons, the league merged with the Lone Star Football League to create Champions Indoor Football for the 2015 season, Lincoln was left out of the league.

Mission statement
To build the city of Lincoln a top tier indoor football organization on and off the playing field, with a focus on family entertainment and community involvement.

Nickname
The Haymakers name traces its roots as a boxing term for a round-house punch. Nebraska's blue collar work ethic and agricultural base also adds to the significance of the Haymakers name. Lincoln's Arena, the Pershing Center, is located near a historic region in Lincoln named the Haymarket.

Mascot and cheerleaders
The Haymakers mascot is a Black Stallion named HayWire who is officially listed as #85 on the team roster. The Cheerleaders are officially known as the "Haymakers' Knockouts"  The Haymakers dropped cheerleaders after Rich Tokhiem purchased the team before the 2014 season.

Franchise history
The franchise started as the Council Bluffs Rams founded in 2000 by Jake Hiffernan. The team started in the recreational Nebraska Indoor Football League, playing with football equipment purchased by Hiffernan, then 24, with his first credit card. They played their games indoors in Lincoln for two years before moving to an outdoor eight-man field in Malcolm, Nebraska. The team, which changed its name to the River City Redemption, won the NIFL title in 2003 and was invited to play an indoor exhibition game against the American Professional Football League champion, Kansas Koyotes. The franchise would become the Iowa Blackhawks in 2004 and joined the APFL. The Blackhawks won back-to-back APFL championships in 2009 and 2010, with their 2009 victory ending the rival Kansas Koyotes six-year run as champions by defeating the Koyotes in the APFL Championship Game. The Blackhawks won the game in dominating fashion with a 63–17 victory over the Koyotes. Citing financial concerns, Hiffernan sold the team in 2011 to local businessman John Jerkovich in an attempt to keep it in Council Bluffs. Brad Lindgren and Justin Hayes purchased the franchise and changed its name to the Council Bluffs Express. Lindgren and Hayes were actually exploring the possibility of starting an expansion franchise in Lincoln prior to last season, but optioned to purchase the Blackhawks when Jerkovich offered the team to them instead. The Express competed in the 2012 APFL Championship game before falling short to the Sioux City Bandits. Following the 2012 APFL season the franchise was purchased by Ho-Chunk Inc., the economic development of the Winnebago Tribe. The ownership group moved the franchise to Lincoln, where they play as the Lincoln Haymakers. Lincoln's first year in the [CPIFL] failed to qualify for the playoffs with a 4-8 record. However, 7 of Lincoln's 8 losses came to playoff teams as the Haymakers had the #2 toughest schedule in the CPIFL.  In the fall of 2013, Rich Tokhiem, who also owns the Omaha Beef indoor football team, purchased the Haymakers.  Under Tokhiem's ownership, Lincoln traded their best player DB Courtney Grixby to the Omaha Beef before the 2014 season. The Haymakers finished 5-7 in 2014 and failed to make the playoffs.  The Haymakers' ceased operations after the 2014 season.

League award winners
2014 All-CPIFL Team Member

K Benny Hanaphy

2013 CPIFL Best Media Relations and Social Media Award

[CPIFL Players of the Week]
Week 1, 2013 DB Cortney Grixby (Defense)
Week 2, 2013 DB Cortney Grixby (Special Teams)
Week 9, 2013 DB Cortney Grixby (Special Teams)
Week 13, 2013 WR Shane Scott (Offense)
Week 14, 2013 LB Willie Horn (Defense)

Week 3, 2014 RB Travis Ribbing (Offense)
Week 7, 2014 ATH Wayne Jacobs (Special Teams)
Week 9, 2014 DL Marcus Miles (Defense)
Week 10, 2014 DL Antonio Ficklin (Defense)

[2013 All-CPIFL Team Members]
WR Nick Rhodes
DB Cortney Grixby

Coaches of note

Head coaches

Current coaching staff

Final roster

2013

Season schedule

Season-by-season results

References

External links
Official website

American football teams in Nebraska
Champions Professional Indoor Football League teams
Sports in Lincoln, Nebraska
American football teams established in 2004
American football teams established in 2014
2004 establishments in Nebraska
2014 disestablishments in Nebraska